James Coats Auchincloss (January 19, 1885 – October 2, 1976) was an American businessman and Republican Party politician who represented northern coastal region of New Jersey in the United States House of Representatives from 1943–1965. His district consisted of Monmouth County, Ocean County, and the part of Middlesex County south of the Raritan River.

Early life
Auchincloss was born in Manhattan, New York City on January 19, 1885.  He was one of eight children, seven sons and one daughter, born to Edgar Stirling Auchincloss (1847–1892) and Maria LeGrange (née Sloan) Auchincloss (1847–1929), who married in 1872.

Among his uncles were Hugh Dudley Auchincloss (father of Hugh D. Auchincloss, Jr.) and John Winthrop Auchincloss (grandfather of Louis Auchincloss). His maternal aunt Sarah Auchincloss (d. 1887) married Sir James Coats, 1st Baronet of the Scottish thread-manufacturing family (and his namesake), and they were the parents of Sir Stuart Coats, 2nd Baronet and British Member of Parliament.  His maternal grandparents were Mary (née Elmendorf) Sloan and New York State Senator Samuel Sloan, who served as president of the Delaware, Lackawanna and Western Railroad for 26 years.

He attended the Cutler School in Manhattan, New York City; and Groton School in Groton, Massachusetts. He graduated from Yale University in 1908.

Career
From 1908 until 1940, he engaged in financial and stock brokerage business with Auchincloss, Joost & Company located at 60 Broadway in New York City. He was a governor of the New York Stock Exchange from 1921 to 1938 (after buying his seat on the Exchange on January 27, 1910, for $92,000, the highest price paid up to that time). He was also the founder, treasurer, president, and chairman of the board of the New York Better Business Bureau.

From 1909 to 1913, Auchincloss served in the Seventh Regiment of the New York National Guard and as Deputy Police Commissioner of New York City.  During World War I, he served as captain, Military Intelligence.

Political career
He was a member of the Rumson, New Jersey, borough council from 1930 to 1937, and served as the borough's mayor from 1938 to 1943.

Auchincloss was elected as a Republican to the Seventy-eighth United States Congress, as well as the ten succeeding Congresses serving from January 3, 1943, until January 3, 1965. Auchincloss voted in favor of the Civil Rights Acts of 1957, 1960, and 1964, as well as the 24th Amendment to the U.S. Constitution. He was not a candidate for reelection in 1964 to the Eighty-ninth Congress.  While in Congress, he founded the Capitol Hill Club in Washington, D.C., in 1951.

Personal life
On October 23, 1909, he was married to Lee Frances Alexander (1888–1959) by the Rev. Dr. Endicott Peabody at the Chapel of the Intercession in New York.  Lee, a 1909 graduate of Barnard College, was a daughter of Dr. Welcome T. Alexander and Aimee G. (née Thayer) Alexander. Together, they resided at various residences, including first at 772 Park Avenue in New York and then in Rumson, New Jersey, and were the parents of:

 James Douglas Auchincloss (1913–2000), who married Lily van Ameringen (1922–1996) in 1956. They divorced in 1979.
 Gordon Auchincloss (1917–1998), who became a writer, director and communications executive.

After her death in 1959, he married Vera Rogers Brown, a daughter of Dr. and Mrs. David T. Brown of Chicago, on November 18, 1960.

He died at a nursing home in Alexandria, Virginia, on October 2, 1976, aged 91.  After a funeral service at the Fifth Avenue Presbyterian Church, he was interred in Woodlawn Cemetery, the Bronx, New York City.

See also
Hugh D. Auchincloss

Notes

References

External links

Political Graveyard bio for James C. Auchincloss

1885 births
1976 deaths
Politicians from Manhattan
United States Army personnel of World War I
Military personnel from New York City
Burials at Woodlawn Cemetery (Bronx, New York)
Groton School alumni
Politicians from Alexandria, Virginia
People from Rumson, New Jersey
Yale University alumni
Auchincloss family
Mayors of Rumson, New Jersey
Republican Party members of the United States House of Representatives from New Jersey
20th-century American politicians
Businesspeople from Alexandria, Virginia
20th-century American businesspeople
United States Army officers
New York National Guard personnel